Mārtiņš Bots (born 12 May 1999) is a Latvian luger. He represented Latvia at the 2022 Winter Olympics.

Career
Bots represented Latvia at the 2022 Winter Olympics in the doubles event where he finished in fourth place with a time of 1:57.419 and won a bronze medal in the team relay.

Bots competed at the 2022 FIL European Luge Championships and won a gold medal in the team relay and a bronze medal in the doubles event.

References

External links
 
 
 
 

1999 births
Living people
Latvian male lugers
Lugers at the 2022 Winter Olympics
Medalists at the 2022 Winter Olympics
Olympic lugers of Latvia
Olympic bronze medalists for Latvia
Olympic medalists in luge
People from Sigulda
21st-century Latvian people